Acts of Thomas is an early 3rd-century text, one of the New Testament apocrypha within the Acts of the Apostles subgenre. References to the work by Epiphanius of Salamis show that it was in circulation in the 4th century. The complete versions that survive are Syriac and Greek. There are many surviving fragments of the text. Scholars detect from the Greek that its original was written in Syriac, which places the Acts of Thomas in Edessa, likely authored before 240 CE. The surviving Syriac manuscripts, however, have been edited to purge them of the most unorthodox overtly Encratite passages, so that the Greek versions reflect the earlier tradition.

Fragments of four other cycles of romances around the figure of the apostle Thomas survive, but this is the only complete one. It should not be confused with the early "sayings" Gospel of Thomas. "Like other apocryphal acts combining popular legend and religious propaganda, the work attempts to entertain and instruct. In addition to narratives of Thomas' adventures, its poetic and liturgical elements provide important evidence for early Syrian Christian traditions," according to the Anchor Bible Dictionary.

Acts of Thomas is a series of episodic Acts (Latin passio) that occurred during the evangelistic mission of Judas Thomas ("Judas the Twin") to Northwest India, specifically the Indo-Parthian Kingdom. It ends with his martyrdom: he dies pierced with spears, having earned the ire of the monarch Misdaeus, thought to be Abdagases I, a viceroy of the Gondopharnes in Sistan, modern day southern Afganistan, because of his conversion of Misdaeus' wives and a relative, Charisius. He was imprisoned while converting Indian followers won through the performing of miracles.

Embedded in the Acts of Thomas at different places according to differing manuscript traditions is a Syriac hymn, The Hymn of the Pearl, (or Hymn of the Soul), a poem that gained a great deal of popularity in mainstream Christian circles. The Hymn is older than the Acts into which it has been inserted, and is worth appreciating on its own. The text is interrupted with the poetry of another hymn, the one that begins "Come, thou holy name of the Christ that is above every name" (2.27), a theme that was taken up in Catholic Christianity in the 13th century as the Holy Name. 

Mainstream Christian tradition rejects the Acts of Thomas as pseudepigraphical and apocryphal, and for its part, the Roman Catholic Church declared Acts as heretical at the Council of Trent. See also Leucius Charinus.

Thomas is often referred to by his name Judas (his full name is Thomas Judas Didymus), since both Thomas and Didymus just mean twin, and several scholars believe that twin is just a description, and not intended as a name. The manuscripts end "The acts of Judas Thomas the apostle are completed, which he did in India, fulfilling the commandment of him that sent him. Unto whom be glory, world without end. Amen.".

Acts of Thomas 

The Acts of Thomas connects Thomas the apostle's Indian ministry with two kings.  According to one of the legends in the Acts, Thomas was at first reluctant to accept this mission, but the Lord appeared to him in a night vision and said, “Fear not, Thomas. Go away to India and proclaim the Word, for my grace shall be with you.” But the Apostle still demurred, so the Lord overruled the stubborn disciple by ordering circumstances so compelling that he was forced to accompany an Indian merchant, Abbanes, to his native place in north-west India, where he found himself in the service of the Indo-Parthian king Gondophares. The apostle's ministry resulted in many conversions throughout the kingdom, including the king and his brother.

The claim made by the acts of Thomas that he traveled to the land of the Parthians and the border of India is supported by other recordings of the time, from writers such as Ephrem the Syrian, Eusebius and Origen The Acts of Thomas states that here is this is where he died, impaled by spears after earring the ire of the monarch Misdaeus, thought to be Abdagases I, a viceroy of the Gondopharnes in Sistan, modern day southern Afghanistan.

According to the legend, Thomas was a skilled carpenter and was bidden to build a palace for the king. However, the Apostle decided to teach the king a lesson by devoting the royal grant to acts of charity and thereby laying up treasure for the heavenly abode. Although little is known of the immediate growth of the church, Bar-Daisan (154–223) reports that in his time there were Christian tribes in North India which claimed to have been converted by Thomas and to have books and relics to prove it. But at least by the year of the establishment of the Second Persian Empire (226), there were bishops of the Church of the East in north-west India comprising Afghanistan and Baluchistan, with laymen and clergy alike engaging in missionary activity.

Content 
The text is broken by headings: 
 1 - when he went into India with Abbanes the merchant. And it even says that Jesus is the son of Joseph. The apostles cast lots to see who will go where as a missionary. Thomas gets India, but refuses his mission, even after Jesus speaks to him. Jesus then appears in human form and sells Thomas to a merchant as a slave, since Thomas is skilled as a carpenter. Thomas is then asked if Jesus is his master, which he affirms. It is only then he accepts his mission.
 2 - concerning his coming unto the king Gundaphorus
 3 - concerning the serpent
 4 - concerning the colt
 5 - concerning the devil that took up his abode in the woman
 6 - of the youth that murdered the woman. A young couple begin to have relationship problems when the woman proves to be too keen on sex, while the male advocates being chaste, honouring the teachings of Thomas. So the male kills his lover. He comes to take the eucharist with others in the presence of Thomas, but his hand withers, and Thomas realises that the male has committed a crime. After being challenged, the male reveals his crime, and the reason for it, so Thomas forgives him, since his motive was good, and goes to find the woman's body. In an inn, Thomas and those with him lay the woman's body on a couch, and, after praying, Thomas has the man hold the woman's hand, whereupon the woman comes back to life.
The story clearly has the gnostic themes of death and resurrection, death not being a bad thing but a result of the pursuit of gnostic teaching, and the resurrection into greater life, once gnostic teaching is understood.
 7 - of the Captain
 8 - of the wild asses
 9 - of the wife of Charisius
 10 - wherein Mygdonia receiveth baptism
 11 - concerning the wife of Misdaeus
 12 - concerning Ouazanes (Iuzanes) the son of Misdaeus
 13 - wherein Iuzanes receiveth baptism with the rest
 The Martyrdom of Thomas
 Leucius Charinus

View of Jesus 
The view of Jesus in the book could be inferred to be docetic. Thomas is not just Jesus' twin, he is Jesus' identical twin. Hence it is possible that Thomas is meant to represent the earthly, human side of Jesus, while Jesus is entirely spiritual in his being. In this way, Jesus directs Thomas' quest from heaven, while Thomas does the work on earth.

Also in line with docetic thinking, is Jesus' portrayed stance on sex, within the text. For example, in one scene, a couple is married, and Jesus appears to the bride in the bridal chamber. He speaks against copulating, even if it is for the purpose of reproduction.

References

Bibliography 
Stefan Heining, Taufe statt Ehe. Ein Beitrag zur Erforschung der Thomasakten (Baptism instead of marriage. A contribution to the exploration of the Acts of Thomas), Univ. Diss., Wurzburg 2020. (urn:nbn:de:bvb:20-opus-210796; https://nbn-resolving.org/urn:nbn:de:bvb:20-opus-210796; cc-by-sa)

External links 

 Medlycott India and Apostle Thomas Acts of Thomas Ed. Menachery
 Early Christian Writings: Acts of Thomas
 The Gnostic Society Library: From the translation and notes by M. R. James in The Apocryphal New Testament, Oxford 1924.

4th-century Christian texts
Gnostic texts
Thomas
Thomas, Acts of
Thomas the Apostle